Grosstaktik (1972) is a set of war game rules written by Leon Tucker for conducting eighteenth century battles.  It was released by Guidon Games as part of the Wargaming in Miniatures series.  Unlike other booklets in the series, it does not have the Guidon Games imprint on the cover or the title page.  The only evidence the rulebook is a Guidon product is on the final page, which lists the booklets available from Guidon, including Grosstaktik.

The rules in Grosstaktik govern weapon fire and melee.  The results of weapon fire are decided by casting a six-sided die and adding modifiers to account for factors such as distance.  The types of weapon fire, in increasing order of deadliness, are carbines, solid shot batteries, muskets, rifles, and grape shot batteries.

When enemy troops encounter each other, they cannot fire and must engage in melee.  Each side rolls a six-sided die, multiplies the result by the number of units in action, and then adds modifiers to account for the quality and morale of the troops.  The ratio of the higher and the lower number is then computed, and this ratio determines whether the side with the lower number stands fast, retires, is routed, or surrenders.  Surrendering is the best result from the point of view of the victor, and occurs when the ratio is 2.5 to 1 or higher.

Grosstaktik is appropriate for re-enacting battles from the War of the League of Augsburg, the War of Spanish Succession, the War of Austrian Succession, the Seven Years' War, and the War of American Independence.  The booklet includes short descriptions of each of these conflicts.

External Links

Guidon Games games
Miniature wargames